Darien Center is a hamlet in Genesee County, New York, United States. Darien Center has a post office with ZIP code 14040, which opened on November 17, 1819.

References

Hamlets in Genesee County, New York
Hamlets in New York (state)